Quisqueya is a genus of orchids, (family Orchidaceae), consisting of four species endemic to the island of Hispaniola (split between the Dominican Republic and Haiti) of the Greater Antilles.
The genus was established in 1979 by Donald Dungan Dod. Its name is derived from the Taíno name for Hispaniola.

References

 Nir, M. Orchidaceae Antillanae, 334–336, 2000.

Laeliinae genera
Flora of Haiti
Flora of the Dominican Republic
Laeliinae